Euclidia amudarya is a moth of the family Erebidae found in Turkmenistan.

References

Moths described in 1998
Euclidia